"From Now On" is a song by American rapper Lil Baby from his third studio album It's Only Me (2022). It features American rapper Future and was produced by Tay Keith and Murda Beatz.

Composition
"From Now On" is a trap-fuelled song which revolves around Lil Baby changing his image, such as abandoning his lifestyle of "pictures with my Styrofoam]]" or buying too many houses. The song ends with him rapping in a whisper flow.

Critical reception
Shanté Collier-McDermott of Clash praised the song, writing that "it sounds just how the product of all four talents would, Baby closing out the track with a cool whisper flow." Alphonse Pierre of Pitchfork was more critical of the song, writing, "On 'From Now On,' his bar about buying too many houses stands out solely because it's a wild problem to have, but it's not tied to any emotion." Christine Werthman of Billboard said, "What better rapper to welcome back to that bleak, hedonistic party than Future, who joins Lil Baby on 'From Now On'? While Baby says his image revamp requires 'no more pictures with my Styrofoam,' Future is contentedly 'drinkin' out Styrofoam,' unbothered or numb or both, his apathy making Lil Baby sound like a hopeful youth by comparison."

Music video
The official music video was released on October 28, 2022. Directed by Envisioned by Denity, it finds Lil Baby and Future performing the song in the studio, on the streets and in shops. They are seen wearing "colorful", expensive clothing, hats and jewelry. it also features a cameo from Lil Uzi Vert.

Charts

References

2022 songs
Lil Baby songs
Future (rapper) songs
Songs written by Lil Baby
Songs written by Future (rapper)
Songs written by Roddy Ricch
Songs written by Tay Keith
Songs written by Murda Beatz
Song recordings produced by Tay Keith
Song recordings produced by Murda Beatz